Robert Alan Browne (June 2, 1932 – June 12, 2018) was an American film and television actor. Browne was born in New York City, New York. He played the minor role of the café owner Ralph Statler in Psycho II and Psycho III. He also played Detective Stanley Bumford in the short-lived crime drama television series Heart of the City.

Browne guest-starred in television programs, including M*A*S*H, Simon & Simon, Dallas, Moonlighting and Three's a Crowd. He died at his home in Laguna Woods, California in June 2018, at the age of 86.

Filmography

Film

Television

References

External links

Rotten Tomatoes profile

1932 births
2018 deaths
People from New York City
Male actors from New York City
American male soap opera actors
American male film actors
American male television actors
20th-century American male actors